Skulberg is a Norwegian surname. Notable people with the surname include:

Anton Skulberg (1921–2012), Norwegian scientist and politician 
Per Kristian Skulberg (born 1951), Norwegian physician and politician

Norwegian-language surnames